Ernest Stanley Duff (January 28, 1900 – February 12, 1979) was an American Negro league outfielder in the 1920s.

A native of Normal, Illinois, Duff made his Negro leagues debut in 1925 with the Chicago American Giants and Indianapolis ABCs. He finished his career in 1929 with the Brooklyn Royal Giants. Duff died in Cincinnati, Ohio in 1979 at age 79.

References

External links
 and Baseball-Reference Black Baseball stats and Seamheads

1900 births
1979 deaths
Brooklyn Royal Giants players
Chicago American Giants players
Cleveland Elites players
Cleveland Hornets players
Cleveland Tigers (baseball) players
Indianapolis ABCs players
Baseball outfielders
Baseball players from Illinois
People from Normal, Illinois
20th-century African-American sportspeople